Elio Fidel Villate Lam (born 1 November 1957 in Pinar del Río, Cuba) is a Cuban painter.

Lam is a member of both the ACAA (Cuban Association of Craftsmen Artists) and the UNEAC (National Union of Writers and Artists of Cuba). Lam studied in 1969 at the Vocational Center of Arts of Pinar del Río. In 1972, he integrated the School of Fine Arts in the same city.

Exhibitions

Collective exhibitions
1982 – Art of the Town, Nicaragua 1990
1982 – National Fair of Artisans, Cuba
1982 – Pinartesania Provincial Gallery Art, Cuba
1991 – Provincial Fine Arts Hall, Pinar del Río, Cuba
1991 – FIART 91, Awarded Cuba
1992 – Museum of Fine Arts, Cuba
1992 – Provincial Fine Arts Hall, Pinar del Río, Cuba
1993 – Fine Arts Hall 13 March, Cuba
1993 – The Biodiversity of the Nature: A valuable patrimony. (Supported by the FAO)

Cuba
1994 – Dreams for a Memory. (Tribute to Alfredo Sarabia), 23 and 12 Gallery, Cuba
1994 – Expo of the ACAA (National Hotel), Cuba
1995 – FITUR, Spain
1995 – Tourist Stock market of Mexico
1995 – FIART 95, Cuba
1995 – Art and Religion, Seat of the ACAA, Habana, Cuba
1995 – Carifesta, Trinidad and Tobago
1996 – Provincial Fine Arts Hall, Pinar del Río, Cuba
1997 – Fair"Popular Art", Concepción, Chile
1997 – FIART 97, Cuba
1997 – 15 Anniversary of the ACAA, Habana, Cuba
1998 – FITUR, Spain
1998 – Annual Exhibition"Pavilion of Culture" Expocuba, Havana, Cuba
1998 – National Hall "Tiburcio Lorenzo" UNEAC, Pinar del Río, Cuba
2001 – Seventh Biennial of Havana.
2001 – Expo "Domingo Gallery Register", Miami, USA
2001 – Expo "Alpha Gallery", Miami, USA
2001 – Auction "for Lights hope" Alpha International Gallery, Miami, USA
2002 – Expo"Artist Cuba" New Jersey, USA
2003 – "Los ruidos y las luces" abstract exhibition with the artist Jorge Luis Ballart. Hotel"Palacio O'farrill". Havana, Cuba
2005 -"Little paper boats" Domingo Padron Gallery. Miami, U.S.A.
2006 – Expo :"Urban testimonial" René Portocarrero's workshop. Havana, Cuba.

Prizes and recognitions
1991 – Provincial Hall of Fine Arts, Pinar del Río, Cuba
1991 – First Prize of the Hall
1991 – Prize UNEAC
1993 – Prize ACAA
1993 – Provincial Hall of Fine Arts, Pinar del Río, Cuba
1993 – First Prize of the Hall
1993 – Prize Fondo cubano de Bienes Culturales, Havana, Cuba
1993 – Hall Fine Arts"13 March" – First Prize 2001
1993 – Recognition for the participation of the Artist in the"Dictionary of Contemporary Artists" and its contribution to disclose the Hispanic culture in the USA. Miami, Florida, USA

Notes and references

1957 births
Living people
Cuban painters